Hebron is a small community  in Albert County overlooking the Bay of Fundy in the Canadian province of New Brunswick.

History

Hebron was founded in 1832, but has since been absorbed by the nearby village of Alma.

See also
List of communities in New Brunswick

References

Communities in Albert County, New Brunswick